Saint-Paul-lès-Durance (literally Saint-Paul near Durance; also spelled Saint-Paul-lez-Durance; Provençal: Sant Pau de Durença) is a commune in the Bouches-du-Rhône department in Provence, southern France.

The Cadarache research center for nuclear energy is located in Saint-Paul-lès-Durance and next to it the international nuclear fusion research and engineering megaproject ITER the most expensive building ever built and the largest scientific research collaboration in history.

The town was established in the 10th century and has around 1,000 inhabitants, a school, a church of the Roman Catholic Archdiocese of Aix, a 15th-century château, and a little shopping center.

Population

See also
Communes of the Bouches-du-Rhône department

References

External links
 Town council website 
 Saint-Paul-lès-Durance on the Quid Web site 
 Picture of the belltower of the church of Saint-Paul-lès-Durance
 Tax information about Saint-Paul-lès-Durance
 Financial information about the commune of Saint-Paul-lès-Durance
 Weather in Saint-Paul-lès-Durance

Communes of Bouches-du-Rhône